The Paper Chase (stylized as "the pAper chAse") was an American alternative rock band formed in 1998 by producer/engineer John Congleton in Dallas, Texas, who were signed to Kill Rock Stars and Southern Records. Their albums God Bless Your Black Heart and Now You Are One of Us have been released on vinyl by the Austrian label Trost Records. Since its inception, The Paper Chase has produced a combination of discordant melody and jagged noise pop, described by Allmusic as "a jagged structure of avant-garde jazz, noise, indie, and punk".

History
Congleton produced all the band's material to date. He also wrote all of the material, with a few exceptions: Bobby Weaver co-wrote "A Face That Could Launch a Thousand Ships" and "Off with Their Heads" from the album Young Bodies Heal Quickly, You Know. Mike Sanger co-wrote "Throw Your Body on the Apparatus", and Elliot Figg co-wrote "When You Least Expect It," both from the aforementioned album.

Their next project would have been a two-part album centered on natural disasters.  The first half, entitled Someday This Could All Be Yours (vol. 1 The Calamities) was released on May 26, 2009 through Kill Rock Stars Records, though the second part has remained unreleased since the band's dissolution.

Members

Former members
John Congleton – vocals, guitar, programming
Sean Kirkpatrick – synthesizer, piano
Bobby Weaver – bass guitar
Jason Garner – drums

Session musicians
Kris Youmans – cello
Becki Phares – violin
Elliot Figg – piano
Danna Berger – viola
Tony Scholl - horns

Previous members
Aryn Dalton – drums
Matt Armstrong – piano

Discography

Albums
 Young Bodies Heal Quickly, You Know (2000)
 Hide the Kitchen Knives (2002)
 God Bless Your Black Heart (2004)
 Now You Are One of Us (2006)
 Cntrl-Alt-Delete-U (2007)
 Someday This Could All Be Yours, Vol. 1 (2009)

Singles and EPs
Essays on Frantic Desperation (split with E-Class and Lugsole) (1999)
...And the Machines Are Winning (1999)

What Big Teeth You Have (2004)
Split with Red Worms Farm (2004)
Split with Will Johnson (2004)
Split with Xiu Xiu (2005)

References

External links
The official Paper Chase website
The Paper Chase on Southern Records' website
[ The Paper Chase] on Allmusic
Acoustic session with 'They Shoot Music - Don't They'

Interviews
Welcome to Flavor Country interview with John Congleton from 2002
SHZine interview with John Congleton (April 2002)
Joe Wallace interviews John Congleton for Gearwire.com
McMahan, Tim (2001) "don't be afraid of the paper chase", Lazy-I

Reviews
Johnson, Zac "[ Young Bodies Heal Quickly, You Know Review]", Allmusic, Macrovision Corporation
Morris, Kurt "[ Hide the Kitchen Knives Review]", Allmusic, Macrovision Corporation
Brown Marisa "[ Now You Are One of Us Review]", Allmusic, Macrovision Corporation
Marshalek, Russ (2006) "The Paper Chase Now You Are One of Us", Stylus Magazine

Alternative rock groups from Texas
Musical groups from Dallas
Musical groups established in 1998
Musical groups disestablished in 2010
Kill Rock Stars artists